Max Houser (c. 1900 – August 5, 1928) was an American football player and coach. He served as the head football coach at the University of Redlands in Redlands, California in 1926, compiling a record of 0–9, and Army and Navy Academy High School in San Diego in 1927. Houser died from drowning in 1928.

Head coaching record

College

References

Year of birth missing
1928 deaths
Notre Dame Fighting Irish football players
Redlands Bulldogs football coaches
High school football coaches in California
Deaths by drowning in California